Elizabeth Phiri is a Zambian politician. She is a former member of Parliament for Kanyama Constituency under the Patriotic Front party and she also served as a Minister of Gender in the Zambian government.

See also 
Politics of Zambia
Edgar Lungu Cabinet 2021

References 

1960 births
Living people
Women government ministers of Zambia
Patriotic Front (Zambia) politicians
Gender ministers of Zambia
21st-century Zambian women politicians
21st-century Zambian politicians